Hilliardville is an unincorporated community in northern Wakulla County, Florida, United States.

Location
Hilliardville is located at the junction of Bloxham Cutoff Road and Springhill Road at the northwest corner of Edward Ball Wakulla Springs State Park. The elevation at Hilliardville is 62 feet (18.8m).

History

Hilliardville has been a community since the late 1800s and was a stop on the Carrabelle, Tallahassee and Georgia Railroad. The train arrived at Hilliardville at 1:55 in the afternoon from Tallahassee, picked up passengers and goods, and departed arriving in Lanark at 3:00 in the afternoon.

References

 Brainy Geoigraphy

Unincorporated communities in Wakulla County, Florida
Unincorporated communities in Florida